Salaš u Malom Ritu (A Farm in Mali Rit) is a Serbian TV series, that was very popular in former Yugoslavia, based on the eponymous novel of Arsen Diklić, with Slavko Štimac in the main role. The show spawned two television films, Salaš u Malom Ritu and Zimovanje u Jakobsfeldu (Wintering in Jacobsfeld).

Synopsis 
The show follows adventures of Milan Maljević, a teenager from the fictional Banatian village called Mali Rit (Little Swamp) during World War II. Mali Rit is a seemingly peaceful village, whose inhabitants do not resist to German occupation. In fact, partisans refrain from attacking the village, used as a secret base, cause they do not want to bring it to German attention. The village's peaceful life is only occasionally disturbed by the commander of a small German barrack within the village.

However, everything in changed once when partisan saboteurs set fire on wheat destined to be transferred to Germany in a neighboring village. As act of reprisal, members of Deutsche Mannschaft take as hostages several men from that village. The Lorry stops in Mali Rit. Vasa, Milan's neighbor and best friend, angered by fact that everybody seemingly is scarred by Germans, gives water to the hostages, after the German commander beats him. In order to get revenge, Vasa decides to set fire to the wheat intended for Germany, hoping that Germans, who guarded the wheat, will share the same fate as the hostages.

Unfortunately to him, Gestapo agent Georg Schitzer arrives in the village . Shcitzer soon became suspicious on loyalty of village people, 'cause Mali Rit is first village in which there was no anti-German activity prior to this fire. Soon he discovers a network of partisan agents in the village, among them are the owner of local tavern, local barber and Vasa's father. Convinced that he will scratch under the surface, Schitzer decides to take hostages (Paja, the owner of the tavern is shot at 6:00). Fearing for life of her son, Milan's mother decides to go in search for partisans to ask them to attack Mali Rit and liberate all hostages. The Partisans liberate all the hostages, and Milan and Petar join them.

In second part of the show, Milan and Petar are with partisans, who are preparing for approaching winter. They will seek new shelter on other side of Danube, but this venture is too dangerous for young Milan, who doesn't want to be separated from his brother. So partisan commander decides to give Milan "special" assignment: to go to his mother and spend winter with her, taking with him a newcomer, rebellious teen called Raša. On the trip, Raša became seriously ill, and Milan goes in neighboring Volksdeutscher village called Jacobsfeld. He finds a job as servant of respected land owner Jacob Jerich. During night Milan goes in hut where he hides Raša, bringing him food. Later he hides Raša in Jerich's stable. Jacob gradually begun to see Milan as his son and plans to adopt him, under condition that Milan give up his non-German origin. In meantime, Šlog, a partisan agent from the city learns, that runaway Raša is somewhere in Jacobsfeld and believes he is captured by Germans, so he begin to plot how to take Raša out. Unknowing to him, his endeavor might blow Milan's cover.

Main cast
 Slavko Štimac – Milan Maljević
 Miodrag Radovanović – Georg Schitzer
 Slobodan Perović – Jacob Jerich
 Ljubomir Živanović – Vasa
 Milan Kuruzović – Branko
 Svetislav Goncić – Raša
 Miroljub Lešo – Petar Maljević
 Milivoje Tomić – barber
 Pavle Vuisić – owner of local tavern
 Renata Ulmanski – Milan's mother
 Ivan Jagodić – Ivan, Vasa's father
 Miomir Petrović – Saša
 Dragan Mirković – Cile
 Dragoljub Milosavljević – Velja
 Ljubomir Ćipranić – peasant
 Dušan Poček – peasant
 Slobodan Velimirović - German Sergeant
 Vojin Kajganić - Sepp
 Stole Aranđelović - Boatman
 Božidar Pavićević - Šuca
 Gizela Vuković - Milan's aunt
 Danilo Čolić - Boško, partisan commander
 Bata Stojković - Damjan
 Ljubica Ković - Marta Jerich
 Milan Srdoč - Peter
 Goran Sultanović - Hans Leiter, head of local Hitlerjugend
 Mihailo Janketić - Šlog
 Toma Kuruzović - veterinary physician
 Oliver Vujovic - young boy

External links
 

1976 Yugoslav television series debuts
1976 Yugoslav television series endings
World War II television drama series
Yugoslav drama television series
Radio Television of Serbia original programming
1970s drama television series
Serbian drama television series
Serbian-language television shows
1970s Yugoslav television series
Television shows set in Serbia
War films set in Partisan Yugoslavia
Television shows filmed in Serbia
Vojvodina in fiction